The men's 5000 metres event was part of the track and field athletics programme at the 1932 Summer Olympics. The competition was held on Tuesday, August 2, 1932, and on Friday, August 5, 1932.

Records
These were the standing world and Olympic records (in minutes) prior to the 1932 Summer Olympics.

In the final Lauri Lehtinen set a new Olympic record with 14:30.0 minutes.

Results

Semifinals

Both semi-finals were held on Tuesday, August 2, 1932, and started at 4:45p.m.

The best seven finishers of every heat qualified for the final.

Semifinal 1

Semifinal 2

Final
The final was held on Friday, August 5, 1932, and started at 3:15p.m.

In a controversial move Lehtinen blocked Hill when he tried to pass Lehtinen on the final straight. Both runners broke the Olympic record but Lehtinen finished 30 cm in front.

References

External links
 Official Olympic Report
 

5000 metres
5000 metres at the Olympics
Men's events at the 1932 Summer Olympics